The 2015 Nigerian Senate election in Kebbi State was held on March 28, 2015, to elect members of the Nigerian Senate to represent Kebbi State. Yahaya Abubakar Abdullahi representing Kebbi North, Adamu Aliero representing Kebbi Central and Bala Na'Allah representing Kebbi South all won on the platform of All Progressives Congress.

Overview

Summary

Results

Kebbi North 
All Progressives Congress candidate Yahaya Abubakar Abdullahi won the election, defeating People's Democratic Party candidate Usman Saidu Nasamu Dakingari and other party candidates.

Kebbi Central 
All Progressives Congress candidate Adamu Aliero won the election, defeating People's Democratic Party candidate Abubakar Malam and other party candidates.

Kebbi South 
All Progressives Congress candidate Bala Na'Allah won the election, defeating People's Democratic Party candidate Abubakar Sadiq and other party candidates.

References 

Kebbi State Senate elections
March 2015 events in Nigeria
Keb